George Sylvester "Red" Callender (March 6, 1916 – March 8, 1992) was an American string bass and tuba player. He is perhaps best known as a jazz musician, but worked with an array of pop, rock and vocal acts as a member of The Wrecking Crew, a group of first-call session musicians in Los Angeles.

Biography
Callender was born in Haynesville, Virginia, United States.  In the early 1940s, he played in the Lester and Lee Young band, and then formed his own trio. In the 1940s, Callender recorded with Nat King Cole, Erroll Garner, Charlie Parker, Wardell Gray, Dexter Gordon, Uffe Baadh and many others.  After a period spent leading a trio in Hawaii, Callender returned to Los Angeles, becoming one of the first black musicians to work regularly in the commercial studios, including backing singer Linda Hayes on two singles. He made his recording debut at 19 with Louis Armstrong's band. However, he later turned down offers to work with Duke Ellington's Orchestra and the Louis Armstrong All-Stars.

On his 1957 Crown LP Speaks Low, Callender was one of the earliest modern jazz tuba soloists. Keeping busy up until his death, some of the highlights of the bassist's later career include recording with Art Tatum and Jo Jones (1955–1956) for the Tatum Group, playing with Charles Mingus at the 1964 Monterey Jazz Festival, working with James Newton's avant-garde woodwind quintet (on tuba), and performing as a regular member of the Cheatham's Sweet Baby Blues Band.  He also reached the top of the British pop charts as a member of B. Bumble and the Stingers. In November 1964, he was introduced and highlighted in performance with entertainer Danny Kaye, in a duet on the Fred Astaire introduced George and Ira Gershwin song, "Slap That Bass", for Kaye's CBS-TV variety show.

Callender died of thyroid cancer at his home in Saugus, California.

Discography

As leader
 1956: Swingin' Suite (Modern)
 1957: Red Callender Speaks Low (Crown)
 1958: The Lowest (MetroJazz)
 1973: Basin Street Brass (Legend)
 1984: Night Mist Blues (Hemisphere)
 ¿?  :  Red Callender Sextet & Fourtette

As sideman
With Gregg Allman Band
 Playin' Up a Storm (Capricorn Records, 1977)
With Patti Austin
 The Real Me (Qwest Records, 1988)
With The Beach Boys
 The Beach Boys' Christmas Album (Capitol, 1964)
With Louis Bellson
 Big Band Jazz from the Summit (Roulette, 1962)
 With Judy Carmichael 
 Pearls (Jazzology, 1985) 
With Benny Carter
 Cosmopolite (Norgran, 1954)
With John Carter
 Dauwhe (Black Saint, 1982)
With Buddy Collette
 Man of Many Parts (Contemporary, 1956)
 Porgy & Bess (Interlude, 1957 [1959])
 Jazz Loves Paris (Speciality, 1958)
With Ry Cooder
 Paradise and Lunch (Reprise Records, 1974)
 Chicken Skin Music (Reprise Records, 1976)
 Jazz (Warner Bros. Records, 1978)
With Sam Cooke
 Twistin' the Night Away (RCA Victor, 1962)
 Mr. Soul (RCA Victor, 1963)
With Willie Dixon
 Hidden Charms (Capitol, 1988)
With Donovan
 7-Tease (Epic Records, 1974)
With Maynard Ferguson
 Maynard Ferguson Octet (EmArcy, 1955)
With Dizzy Gillespie
 The New Continent (Limelight, 1962)
With Johnny Hodges
 In a Tender Mood (Norgran, 1952 [1955])
 The Blues (Norgran, 1952–54, [1955])
With Paul Horn 
 Plenty of Horn (Dot, 1958)
 Jazz Suite on the Mass Texts (RCA Victor, 1965) with Lalo Schifrin
With Plas Johnson
 This Must Be the Plas (Capitol Records, 1959)
With B.B. King
 Blues in My Heart (Crown Records, 1962)
 L.A. Midnight (ABC Records, 1972)
With Peggy Lee
 Jump for Joy (Capitol Records, 1959)
With Rickie Lee Jones
 Rickie Lee Jones (Warner Bros. Records, 1979)
With Kate & Anna McGarrigle
 Kate & Anna McGarrigle (Warner Bros. Records, 1976)
With Maria Muldaur
 Waitress in a Donut Shop (Reprise Records, 1974)
With Randy Newman
 Good Old Boys (Reprise Records, 1974)
With Gene Parsons
 Kindling (Warner Bros. Records, 1973)
With Pete Rugolo
 Rugolo Plays Kenton (EmArcy, 1958)
 The Original Music of Thriller (Time, 1961)
With Mavis Rivers and Shorty Rogers
 Mavis Meets Shorty (Riverside, 1963)
With Art Tatum and Ben Webster
 The Art Tatum - Ben Webster Quartet (Verve, 1956 [1958])
With James Taylor
 In the Pocket (Rhino Records, 1976)
 JT (Columbia Records, 1977)
With Gerald Wilson
 Calafia (Trend, 1985)
With Betty Wright
 Wright Back At You (Epic Records, 1983)

Bibliography

References

External links

American jazz double-bassists
Male double-bassists
American jazz tubists
American male jazz musicians
Deaths from cancer in California
Deaths from thyroid cancer
Cool jazz double-bassists
Cool jazz tubists
RCA Victor artists
Recorded In Hollywood artists
1916 births
1992 deaths
People from Richmond County, Virginia
People from Saugus, Santa Clarita, California
20th-century American musicians
American session musicians
Jazz musicians from Virginia
20th-century double-bassists
20th-century American male musicians
Earle Spencer Orchestra members
Southland Records artists
Jazz musicians from California